The Route du Rhum is a single person transatlantic race the 2006 race was the 8th edition and had eight classes with 74 boats taking part.

Results

Multihulls - Class 1,2 & 3

ORMA 60

Monohulls - Class 1,2 & 3

IMOCA 60

Class 40

External links
 
 Official You Tube Channel

References

Route du Rhum
2006 in sailing
Route du Rhum
Single-handed sailing competitions
Class40 competitions
IMOCA 60 competitions